

Champions

Professional
Men
2003 NBA Finals:  San Antonio Spurs over the New Jersey Nets 4-2.  MVP:  Tim Duncan  (More information can be found at 2003-04 NBA season.)
2002-03 NBA season
2003 NBA Playoffs
2003 NBA draft
2003 NBA All-Star Game
Eurobasket: Lithuania 93, Spain 84
Women
WNBA Finals: Detroit Shock over Los Angeles Sparks 2-1.  MVP:  Ruth Riley
2003 WNBA season
2003 WNBA Playoffs
2003 WNBA draft
2003 WNBA All-Star Game
Eurobasket Women: Russia def. Czech Republic

College
Men
NCAA Division I:  Syracuse University 81, University of Kansas 78
National Invitation Tournament:  University of Michigan
NCAA Division II: Northeastern State University 75, Kentucky Wesleyan College 64
NCAA Division III: Williams College 67, Gustavus Adolphus College 65
NAIA Division I Concordia 88, Mountain State 84 OT
NAIA Division II Oregon Tech 81, Bellevue (Neb.) 70
Women
NCAA Division I:  University of Connecticut 73, University of Tennessee 68
Women's National Invitation Tournament: Auburn 64, Baylor 63
NCAA Division II: South Dakota State 65, Northern Kentucky University 60
NCAA Division III Trinity University (Tex.) 60, Eastern Connecticut State 58
NAIA Division I: Southern Nazarene (Okla.) 71, Oklahoma City University 70
NAIA Division II Hastings (Neb.) 59, Dakota Wesleyan (S.D.) 53

Awards and honors

Naismith Memorial Basketball Hall of Fame
Class of 2003:
 Leon Barmore
 Francis D. "Chick" Hearn
 Earl F. Lloyd
 Meadowlark Lemon
 Dino Meneghin
 Robert L. Parish
 James A. Worthy

Women's Basketball Hall of Fame
Class of 2003
 Leon Barmore
 Tara Heiss
 Claude Hutcherson
 Patsy Neal
 Doris Rogers
 Marsha Sharp

Professional
Men
NBA Most Valuable Player Award: Tim Duncan
NBA Rookie of the Year Award: Amar'e Stoudemire
NBA Defensive Player of the Year Award: Ben Wallace
NBA Coach of the Year Award: Gregg Popovich, San Antonio Spurs
Euroscar Award: Dirk Nowitzki, Dallas Mavericks and 
Women
WNBA Most Valuable Player Award: Lauren Jackson, Seattle Storm
WNBA Defensive Player of the Year Award: Sheryl Swoopes, Houston Comets
WNBA Rookie of the Year Award: Cheryl Ford, Detroit Shock
WNBA Most Improved Player Award: Michelle Snow, Houston Comets
Kim Perrot Sportsmanship Award: Edna Campbell, Sacramento Monarchs
WNBA Coach of the Year Award: Bill Laimbeer, Detroit Shock
WNBA Finals Most Valuable Player Award: Ruth Riley, Detroit Shock

Collegiate 
 Combined
Legends of Coaching Award: Roy Williams, Kansas
 Men
John R. Wooden Award: T. J. Ford, Texas
Naismith College Coach of the Year: Tubby Smith, Kentucky
Frances Pomeroy Naismith Award: Jason Gardner, Arizona
Associated Press College Basketball Player of the Year: David West, Xavier
NCAA basketball tournament Most Outstanding Player: Emeka Okafor, Connecticut
USBWA National Freshman of the Year: Carmelo Anthony, Syracuse
Associated Press College Basketball Coach of the Year: Tubby Smith, Kentucky
Naismith Outstanding Contribution to Basketball: Charles “Lefty” Driesell
 Women
Naismith College Player of the Year: Diana Taurasi, Connecticut
Naismith College Coach of the Year: Gail Goestenkors, Duke
Wade Trophy: Diana Taurasi, Connecticut
Frances Pomeroy Naismith Award: Kara Lawson, Tennessee
Associated Press Women's College Basketball Player of the Year: Diana Taurasi, Connecticut
NCAA basketball tournament Most Outstanding Player: Diana Taurasi, UConn
Basketball Academic All-America Team: Kristine Austgulen, VCU
Carol Eckman Award: Marsha Sharp, Texas Tech University
USBWA National Freshman of the Year: Seimone Augustus, LSU
Associated Press College Basketball Coach of the Year: Geno Auriemma, Connecticut
List of Senior CLASS Award women's basketball winners: LaToya Thomas, Mississippi State
Nancy Lieberman Award: Diana Taurasi, Connecticut
Naismith Outstanding Contribution to Basketball: Betty Jaynes

Events

Deaths
January 20 — Dan King, American NBA player (Baltimore Bullets) (born 1931)
January 29 — John Murphy, American BAA player (Philadelphia Warriors, New York Knicks) (born 1924)
February 9 — John Hyder, American college coach (Georgia Tech) (born 1912)
March 29 — Carl Ridd, Canadian Olympic player (1952) (born 1929)
April 5 — Helgi Jóhannsson, Icelandic basketball player and coach (born 1929)
April 16 — Jewell Young, All-American college player (Purdue), NBL player (Indianapolis Kautskys, Oshkosh All-Stars) (born 1913)
May 14 — Dave DeBusschere, American Hall of Fame NBA player (New York Knicks, Detroit Pistons) (born 1940)
May 14 — Al Fleming, American NBA player (Seattle SuperSonics) (born 1954)
May 23 — Weenie Miller, American college coach (VMI) (born 1922)
May 29 — Anthony Frederick, American NBA player (Indiana Pacers, Sacramento Kings, Charlotte Hornets) (born 1964)
June 16 — David Polansky, American college coach (CCNY) (born 1919)
June 22 — John Mandic, American NBA player (born 1919)
September 20 — Ernie Calverley, All-American player and coach at Rhode Island (born 1924)
October 16 — Chet Jaworski, All-American player (Rhode Island) (born 1916)
October 23 — Kevin Magee, Former All-American at UC Irvine and Maccabi Tel Aviv player (born 1959)
October 30 — Stan Szukala, American NBL player (Chicago Bruins, Chicago American Gears) (born 1918)
November 21 — Bill Haarlow, American NBL player (Whiting Ciesar All-Americans) (born 1913)
December 8 — Chuck Noe, American college coach (VMI, Virginia Tech, South Carolina, VCU) (born 1924)
December 9 — Norm Sloan, College basketball coach of the 1974 national champion NC State Wolfpack (born 1926)
December 26 — Gale Bishop, All-American college (Washington State) and BAA (Philadelphia Warriors) player (born 1922)

See also
 Timeline of women's basketball

References